Gilles Martin (born 20 October 1963 in Paris) is a French engineer, scientist and billionaire. He is the founder and executive chairman of Eurofins Scientific.

Biography

Education 
Martin's parents, Maryvonne Lucie Martin and Gérard-Jean Martin, were both chemistry professors at the University of Nantes. Gilles attended Centrale Paris where he dedicated a large part of his time to creating a company specialized in mathematics learning, Objectif Maths, alongside his friend Hervé Lecat, to whom he later sold his shares.

Martin then went on to work as a research assistant at Syracuse University, where he developed an diagnostic system using magnetic resonance imaging. After obtaining a master's degree and a PhD, he returned to France.

Eurofins Scientific 
Originally, Martin's parents had patented a process for measuring sugar levels in wines, and entrusted their Gilles and his brother Yves-Loïc with the development and marketing of the process. The company's was launched in 1987. Gilles bought the patent from the Scientific Research National Center (CNRS), discovered new applications for the patent, and expanded the company's clientele to the entire food industry. The company quickly reached 50 employees and exported 70% of its production.

Eurofins then proceeded to massively buy out other laboratories, including by financing laboratories in start-up mode. This aggressive acquisition policy allowed the company to reach 50,000 employees by 2020.

Wealth 
According to Forbes, Gilles Martin owns about 25% of Eurofins' capital through the family's holding company Analytical Bioventures. His fortune is estimated to be $5.2 billion, making him the 757th richest person in the world (as of December 2021).

Awards 

 2007 National Entrepreneur Award

See also 

 List of French people
 Forbes list of billionaires
 List of billionaires

References 

1963 births
Living people
French billionaires
French engineers
French scientists
Syracuse University alumni
École Centrale Paris alumni